Nan Fung Group is a privately held group of companies carrying on the business of property development as its core business in Greater China, including shipping, textiles and financial services. It is also one of the leading property developers and largest privately held developers in Hong Kong.

Company background 
The history of Nan Fung Group can be traced back to 27 May 1954, when Nan Fung Textiles Limited was founded by Ningbo-born businessman, Chen Din Hwa as a small textile company in Hong Kong. Nan Fung Group started its first real estate project in 1965. In 1978, it developed its first major private housing estate, Nam Fung Sun Chuen, in Quarry Bay, Hong Kong.

Property development and other businesses 
Nan Fung Group has property development as its core business. The group entered the property development business in the mid-1960s in Hong Kong by purchasing residential and commercial buildings and then by land acquisition for development. In the mid-1990s, the group began investing in China's property market and since 2001 has built projects in major Chinese cities including Beijing, Shanghai and Guangzhou. The group is also involved in international projects as sole investor or as a joint venture partner in major cities around the world.

Nan Fung Group diversifies in businesses in areas such as property construction, property management, property finance, hotel and the shipping industries.

Executives 
Vivien Chen, the younger daughter of Chen Din Hwa, became the Chairman of Nan Fung Group when her father was diagnosed with Alzheimer's disease in 2009 and stepped down in 2014. Vivien is still the company's controlling stakeholder and serves as honorary chairman while her youngest daughter Vanessa serves as the managing director.

Antony Leung, the former Financial Secretary of Hong Kong, joined Nan Fung Group as the group's Chief Executive in February 2014.

List of chairmen 

 Chen Din-hwa (1954–2009)
 Vivian Chen (2009–2016)
 Antony Leung (2016– )

References

External links 
Official website of Nan Fung Group

 
Real estate companies established in 1954
Land developers of Hong Kong
Shipping companies of Hong Kong
Chinese companies established in 1954